Lord George Fox-Selwyn is a fictional character in the Montmorency series by Eleanor Updale. He is a member of Bargles, an upper-class club, where the lead character Montmorency resides. Fox-Selwyn is a wealthy aristocrat, Montmorency’s first true friend, who introduces him to the lifestyle and society of the British aristocracy. Fox-Selwyn is also an undercover agent of the British Crown, albeit an unpaid one.

Physical appearance
George Fox-Selwyn has small feet but is relatively portly. He is quite bald and has a large beard. His clothes are up-to-date and he wears clothes that are the height of fashion. This may be because he is very rich.

Appearances

Book 1: Montmorency
Fox-Selwyn first appears part way through this book. Montmorency is crossing the road outside the Marimion with Cissie when a carriage nearly hits him. The carriage belongs to Fox-Selwyn who becomes a firm friend with Montmorency. He is responsible for introducing Montmorency to many aspects of upper class life such as races and the gentlemans’ club, Bargles. It is also he who leads Montmorency into a life of espionage. He suspects that the Mauramanians ambassador is involved in the illegal arms trade. Montmorency turns getting into the embassy from just a friendly jibe to a betting matter saying  “I bet you I could get in!” .

Book 2: Montmorency on the Rocks
George Fox-Selwyn plays a slightly more major role in this book. He sees Montmorency under the influence of a mysterious Turkish drug. He realises that the only person who can save him is his doctor: Robert Farcett. He arranges for them to meet in his brother’s mansion in Scotland. He returns to London after being asked by a school friend to help solve the crime of a train station bombing. Montmorency also reveals his past to him.

Book 3: Montmorency and the assassins
This book takes place twenty years after the events of the previous book. Fox-Selwyn and Montmorency are on a leisurely assignment looking for some lost museum specimens in Italy. He goes to Paterson, New Jersey in America where all of the major characters foil another anarchist plot. At the end he mysteriously disappears causing Montmorency to wonder where he is. He is found dead at Lord Astleman's house, where he was killed by the anarchists in preserving liquid.

External links
 Eleanor Updale (official)
 Library Thing page for the first book in the series
 Library Thing page for the second book in the series
 Library Thing page for the third book in the series
 Library Thing page for the fourth book in the series
 Fantastic Fiction page for Eleanor Updale and all her works

Fictional British secret agents
Fictional lords and ladies
Characters in young adult book series
Literary characters introduced in 2003